The Christmas List is a 1997 TV movie, shown first on The Family Channel, thereafter on ABC Family during its 25 Days of Christmas programming block. It stars Mimi Rogers.

Synopsis
The story follows the life of the 35-year-old Melody Parris (Played by Mimi Rogers), a skilled perfume girl, who is living a somewhat flavorless life in Seattle, with a pompous, pushy boyfriend named George and an overbearing mother (Stella Stevens) who lives right next door to her, who is obsessed with her getting married.

It starts with another unsatisfactory day at work for Melody, but on the bus, her best friend Naomi tells her to make a Christmas list for selfish fun. She starts to but then receives a call from George, who is on a flight home from a business trip.

During a talk with her mother that evening, she asks her if they could try to make their Christmas "Dickens-Style"; however her mother is reluctant to do this. Another neighbor's daughter, Amber Mottola, is a supermodel, and her mother harps on how Melody's sister is married, and so Melody storms out, saying that she's sorry she's not anything that makes her mother proud, missing her mother saying that she is proud.

The next day at work, Melody is passed over for a promotion to the head of the perfume department at the department store where she works for a younger, less skilled co-worker, April May, whose main objective is to sell, not to serve. Melody finally decides to finish her Christmas list, and the next day, she takes it to work and (after some playfulness with Naomi) Naomi puts it in Santa's Mailbox at the department store. Then, things begin to change. She meets Danny Skylar, a boy who wants to buy a perfume that was similar to the smell of his late mother's, and when he can't pay the full amount, Melody loans him the rest, and he puts her name, along with his, on the entry form in a sweepstakes at the store to win a new Ford Mustang convertible.

Danny drags his father to attend the drawing for the Mustang, and his father is surprised when Danny and Melody win. Melody gets into trouble because store employees cannot enter drawings, but Danny explains the mix-up and pledges to give her the car until he can drive. Melody is attracted to Danny's father, Dr. David Skylar, and while she gives them the car, her boyfriend intervenes and they work out a schedule so that they can share the car, which offers opportunities for Melody and Dr. Skylar to start to share a close bond. That same night, a tree appears in Melody's apartment, and Melody's mother changes as well, becoming more maternal and says that the whole family is going to be celebrating Christmas Dickens-style.

When Danny goes to make another payment on the perfume, he asks Melody to go to lunch with him, and George comes as well. However, at lunch Melody and George argue, resulting in Melody pouring a bowl of creme brulee onto George's lap. A woman named Faith (Marla Maples) is dating Dr. Skylar and wants to eliminate any competition, so she fakes her engagement to Dr. Skylar, buying a fake ring and bragging to Melody. Upset, Melody gives the car to the Skylars to keep. When George proposes clumsily, Melody declines, and when they start to fight, Melody's mother recoils at George, and we find out she put the tree in Melody's apartment, and acted the way she did because she wanted for her daughter to know that she was proud of her. David finds out about Faith's treachery and dumps her. He and Danny drive to Melody's apartment building where David proposes and Melody accepts, much to Danny's delight and approval.

Throughout the movie, Melody starts getting other things on her list that she wanted, whether it be fuzzy slippers, or wanting her family to celebrate Christmas Dickens Style. But she slowly realizes that while getting everything she wants, repercussions are inevitable, and she realizes that what you want is not always what you need. As she starts to fill up the holes from the list, she begins a new life with David, Danny and even having a new baby.

Cast
 Mimi Rogers as Melody Parris
 Rob Stewart as Dr. David Skyler
 Stella Stevens as Natalie Parris
 Bill Switzer as Danny Skyler
 Enuka Okuma as Naomi
 Jano Frandsen as George
 Madison Graie as April May
 Andrew Johnston as Mr. Garnett
 George Pilgrim		
 Marla Maples as Faith
 Tony Griffin	as Eric Katz
 Gary Hetherington as Daumier
 Tanja Reichert as Suzie (as Tanja Reichart)
 Anne Farquhar as Caroline
 Paul Raskin as Ted

Critical reception
The film was well received by viewers, for its original script, both comedic and dramatic, and was nominated by the Young Artists Awards in 1998 for Best Family Cable TV Movie, and Bill Switzer was nominated for Best Performance in a TV Movie as a Supporting Young Actor. The film was also dubbed into Italian, Spanish, German, Romanian and Dutch.

Title song
The song at the beginning of the film is a vocal holiday rendition of "A Time For Tony", written in 1963 by Merv Griffin (the film's executive producer). "A Time For Tony" is better known by its alternate title "Think!", which has been used as the music for the final round of the game show Jeopardy! since the show's premiere in 1964 and also as the show's theme song beginning in 1984.

See also 
 List of Christmas films

External links
 
  Newer Christmas List release by Hallmark

1990s English-language films
American Christmas drama films
ABC Family original films
1997 television films
1997 films
Films directed by Charles Jarrott
Films set in Seattle
Films about wish fulfillment
Saban Entertainment films
1990s Christmas drama films
1990s American films